August Baskår Pedersen (born 24 June 1994) is a Norwegian handball player.

He hails from Notodden. He has played for Haslum HK, ØIF Arendal from 2016 to 2018, and Bjerringbro-Silkeborg. In 2022 Pedersen joined 2013-14 EHF Champions League winners SG Flensburg-Handewitt from Drammen HK as a replacement for Hampus Wanne.

See also 
 https://de.wikipedia.org/wiki/August_Pedersen German Wikipedia article

References 

1994 births
Living people
People from Notodden
Norwegian male handball players
Expatriate handball players
Norwegian expatriate sportspeople in Denmark
Norwegian expatriate sportspeople in Germany